This is a list of episodes of the American science-fiction series The Bionic Woman. The series was aired from 1976 to 1978 in three seasons with three television movies produced from 1987 to 1994. The series was a spin-off from The Six Million Dollar Man, where the character of Jaime Sommers (The Bionic Woman) had been introduced in the stories: The Bionic Woman (1975) and The Return of the Bionic Woman (1975).

Series overview

Episodes

Season 1 (1976)

Regular cast: Lindsay Wagner (Jaime Sommers), Richard Anderson (Oscar Goldman)
Producer: Kenneth Johnson

NOTES:
For years, "Welcome Home, Jaime," has been the subject of much debate and speculation in fan communities. For much of its post-broadcast life it was believed to have aired as originally intended: on Sunday, January 11, 1976 as a Six Million Dollar Man episode.
But research for Time-Life's 2010 Six Million Dollar Man - The Complete DVD Collection revealed evidence to the contrary. Vintage promotional recordings and numerous newspaper articles indicate that "Welcome Home, Jaime," was pulled from the Six Million Dollar Man’s, Sunday night time slot, re-edited with Bionic Woman main/end titles and credits, issued a new production number, and pushed up to make its ABC broadcast début on Wednesday, January 14, 1976 as the première episode of The Bionic Woman. The 2010 DVD release of the first season The Bionic Woman went to press before this information was revealed, and thus incorrectly labels "Welcome Home Jaime" as part of The Six Million Dollar Man series.

Season 2 (1976–77)

Regular cast: Lindsay Wagner (Jaime Sommers), Richard Anderson (Oscar Goldman), Martin E. Brooks (Dr. Rudy Wells)
Producer: Kenneth Johnson

Season 3 (1977–78)

Regular cast: Lindsay Wagner (Jaime Sommers), Richard Anderson (Oscar Goldman), Martin E. Brooks (Dr. Rudy Wells)
Producers: Lionel E. Siegel, Arthur Rowe, James D. Parriott, Ralph Sarriego, Nancy Malone, Joseph D'Agosta

Television movies

Regular cast: Lindsay Wagner (Jaime Sommers), Lee Majors (Steve Austin), Richard Anderson (Oscar Goldman), Martin E. Brooks (Dr. Rudy Wells)

See also 
 List of The Six Million Dollar Man episodes
 Bionic Woman (2007 TV series)#Episodes

Notes and references

External links 
 The Bionic Woman at IMDb

Episodes
Bionic Woman, The
Bionic Woman